Carolyn Marie Reid (born 28 March 1972) is a retired female field hockey goalkeeper, who was a member of the British squad that competed at the 2000 Summer Olympics in Sydney, Australia. She won a total number of three medals (two silver, one bronze) during her career at the Commonwealth Games.

References

External links
 
 

1972 births
Living people
English female field hockey players
Field hockey players at the 2000 Summer Olympics
Field hockey players at the 1998 Commonwealth Games
Field hockey players at the 2002 Commonwealth Games
Field hockey players at the 2006 Commonwealth Games
Olympic field hockey players of Great Britain
British female field hockey players
Commonwealth Games silver medallists for England
Commonwealth Games bronze medallists for England
Commonwealth Games medallists in field hockey
Female field hockey goalkeepers
Place of birth missing (living people)
Medallists at the 1998 Commonwealth Games
Medallists at the 2002 Commonwealth Games
Medallists at the 2006 Commonwealth Games